Suphanburi Football Club is a Thai professional football club based in Suphan Buri province. The club competes in the Thai League 2, the second tier of Thai football. Their home stadium is Suphan Buri Provincial Stadium.

Club history

Founded in 1998, Suphanburi Football Club became a member of the Thailand Provincial League which ran parallel to the Thai League and was overseen by the Sports Authority of Thailand (SAT). In the league's inaugural year of 1999, the club finished as runners-up. Overall, Suphanburi was one of the most successful teams in the Pro League. They won the league title twice (2002 and 2004) and were also runners up on three occasions.

League history
In 2005 the club finished as runners up in the Thai league and were promoted to the Thai Premier League alongside champions Chonburi, Suphanburi became the first provincial club to join the TPL. However, the clubs moved in very different directions over the subsequent years. Due to a league expansion, Suphanburi avoided relegation. However, a year later Chonburi became champions whilst Suphanburi were relegated. In the following season, Suphanburi finished mid-table in Division 1 and never looked like challenging for promotion. They were relegated from the Thai Division 1 League in 2010. A late decision to expand the 1st division allowed them to regain their 1st division status if they could beat Saraburi FC in a two-legged play-off. The War Elephant won 3–2 on aggregate to retain their place in Division 1. In 2012 the club's first success was a runners-up spot in Division 1 and the team were promoted back into the Thai Premier League. For the 2013 season, few people saw Suphanburi as serious contenders for honours. However, after starting the season with a seven-match unbeaten run, they eventually finished fourth, losing only nine times in their thirty-two game campaign.

Academy development
The Under 19 team under the guidance of Nigerian coach Sakiru Fagbohun, known as "Coach Ken", reached the final of the 2014 Coke Cup, where they narrowly lost 2–1 to three-time champions Buriram United, this achievement was remarked greatly as Suphanburi Fc u19 defied the odds and challenged the three-time champions competitively. The club have embarked on an ambitious six-year plan to create teams from Under 13 to Under 18, starting with a new intake of Under 13 players each year. The young players will be based at the Institute of Physical Education, which is next door to the main stadium. In 2016 Suphanburi Football Academy signed a formal partnership with Borussia Dortmund for three years. In this partnership, Borussia Dortmund will be sending world-class coaches to the youth training center in Kanchanapisekwittayalai Suphanburi school, as well as a coach to train the Thai coach.

Stadium and locations

Season by season record
 

P = Played
W = Games won
D = Games drawn
L = Games lost
F = Goals for
A = Goals against
Pts = Points
Pos = Final position
N/A = No answer

TPL = Thai Premier League
TL = Thai League 1

DQ = Disqualified
QR1 = First Qualifying Round
QR2 = Second Qualifying Round
QR3 = Third Qualifying Round
QR4 = Fourth Qualifying Round
RInt = Intermediate Round
R1 = Round 1
R2 = Round 2
R3 = Round 3

R4 = Round 4
R5 = Round 5
R6 = Round 6
GR = Group stage
QF = Quarter-finals
SF = Semi-finals
RU = Runners-up
S = Shared
W = Winners

Players

First-team squad
Below is a list of players playing for Suphanburi as the official website confirms.

Out on loan

Head coaches history
Coaches by years (2012–present)

1Suphanburi qualified to 2016 AFC Champion League Preliminary Round 2 by finishing third place in 2015 Thai Premier League and Buriram United F.C. winning 2015 Thai FA Cup. However, Suphanburi was not able to play in the competition because they did not meet the AFC Club licensing criteria. Chonburi replaced them in the continental spot.

Honours

Domestic competitions
Provincial League:
Champions:(2) 2002, 2004

See also
 Suphanburi F.C. Reserves and Academy

References

External links
 Official Website
 Facebook

 
Thai League 1 clubs
Football clubs in Thailand
Sport in Suphan Buri province
Association football clubs established in 1998
1998 establishments in Thailand